Hypselonotus is a genus of leaf-footed bugs in the family Coreidae. There are about 12 described species in Hypselonotus.

Species
These 12 species belong to the genus Hypselonotus:

 Hypselonotus aberrans Horváth, 1913
 Hypselonotus argutus Brailovsky, 1982
 Hypselonotus bitrianguliger Berg, 1892
 Hypselonotus fulvus (De Geer, 1773)
 Hypselonotus interruptus Hahn, 1833
 Hypselonotus linea (Fabricius, 1803)
 Hypselonotus lineatus Stål, 1862
 Hypselonotus orientalis Brailovsky, 1993
 Hypselonotus punctiventris Stål, 1862 (spot-sided coreid)
 Hypselonotus subterpunctatus Amyot & Serville, 1843
 Hypselonotus thoracicus Signoret, 1862
 Hypselonotus tricolor Breddin, 1901

References

Further reading

External links

 

Articles created by Qbugbot
Coreini
Coreidae genera